Juuso Kaijomaa (born March 12, 1989) is a Finnish ice hockey player who currently plays professionally in Finland for SaiPa of the SM-liiga.

References

External links

Living people
1989 births
Finnish ice hockey forwards
Espoo United players
Jokipojat players
Mikkelin Jukurit players
SaiPa players